Abdul Latif Khan (1927 – 2003) was an Indian classical musician and instrumentalist, known for his proficiency in Sarangi, a stringed Hindustani classical music instrument.

Early life and career
He was born in a family of musicians in Gwalior in the Indian state of Madhya Pradesh, learned music under the tutelage of Haider Khan, his grandfather, Chhote Khan, his father, Chhote Khan and Uday Khan and Haddu Khan, all were his extended family, in Khyal Gharana style and mastered the instruments such as Sitar, Santoor and Tabla Later, he learned Sarangi under Bade Ghulam Sabir Khan.

Abdul Latif Khan had performed at many music festivals like Bhopal Sarangi Mela and had been a staff artist at the All India Radio, Bhopal. He had performed as an accompanist to such renowned musicians as Bade Ghulam Ali Khan, Amir Khan, Hirabai Barodekar, Nazakat and Salamat Ali Khan, Kumar Gandharva, Mallikarjun Mansur and Kishori Amonkar.

Awards and recognition
A recipient of the Sangeet Natak Akademi Award in 1990, 
Abdul Latif Khan was honored by the Government of India with the fourth highest Indian civilian award, the Padma Shri, in 2002.

References

External links

 

Hindustani instrumentalists
Indian Muslims
1934 births
2002 deaths
People from Gwalior
People from Madhya Pradesh
Recipients of the Padma Shri in arts
Recipients of the Sangeet Natak Akademi Award
Sarangi players